Hayy Al-Nahdha is a Neighborhood in  Ibri which located in  Al-Dhahira Governorate and it is about 3km from the center of the city.

Location 
Near to Al-Dhahira Police Headquarter.

Climate

Education

Khadra' Ibri School, Al-Wafa center for the rehabilitation of disabled children.

Populated places in Ad Dhahirah North Governorate